Quindim ( —  or ) is a popular Brazilian baked dessert with Portuguese heritage, made chiefly from sugar, egg yolks and ground coconut. It is a custard and usually presented as an upturned cup with a glistening surface and intensely yellow color. The mixture can also be made in a large ring mold (like a savarin mold) in which case it is called a "quindão" and served in slices.

Etymology

The word quindim comes from dikende in Kikongo, a Bantu language. It means "the gestures, or demeanor, or humor characteristic of adolescent girls."

Origins 

The heavy use of egg yolks is characteristic of many Portuguese sweets and pastries, such as the papo de anjo ("angel's crop") and fios de ovos ("egg threads"). Their combination with coconut and sugar was probably created by African slaves in 17th century Brazilian Northeast,  where coconuts were abundant and sugar (from sugarcane) was a major industry.

In popular culture

Quindim is also a rhinoceros character (named after the dessert) featured in Monteiro Lobato's children's books.

It is also the subject of the song Os Quindins de Yayá which is featured in The Three Caballeros and sung by Aurora Miranda.

See also 

 Custard and flan
 List of Brazilian dishes
 List of Brazilian sweets and desserts
 List of custard desserts

References

External links

Quindim – DessertEater.com
Quindim Recipe
Quindim
RECIPE - Quindim (from FENADOCE)
Coconut quindim

Brazilian desserts
Custard desserts
Foods containing coconut